The cinema of Angola currently suffers from financial issues around the funding of new films. In the early 2000s, the Angolan government helped fund a small number of films, however this programme stopped towards the end of the decade. During this time the film The Hero was filmed in Angola and won the World Dramatic Cinema Jury Grand Prize at the 2005 Sundance Film Festival. The first cinemas in Angola were built in the 1930s, with a total of 50 being built by the middle of the 1970s. Many are now in a state of disrepair, but there is an effort to restore some of them.

See also
 List of Angolan films

References